Benvenue is a historic plantation house located near Rocky Mount, Nash County, North Carolina.  Originally built in 1844, the house was expanded and extensively remodeled to its present Second Empire form in 1889.  It is a large -story, three bay by three bay, frame dwelling with a one-story rear ell.  It features a steep mansard roof with imbricated and floral patterned slate tiles.  Also on the property are the contributing frame kitchen, dovetailed log rootcellar, frame dairyhouse, smokehouses, commissary, a restored greenhouse, spring house, and a one-room schoolhouse.  It was the home of Congressman Benjamin H. Bunn (1844-1907).

It was listed on the National Register of Historic Places in 1982.

References

Plantation houses in North Carolina
Houses on the National Register of Historic Places in North Carolina
Second Empire architecture in North Carolina
Houses completed in 1844
Houses in Nash County, North Carolina
National Register of Historic Places in Nash County, North Carolina